Peperomia litana is a species of plant in the family Piperaceae. It is endemic to Ecuador. It is a fairly small, glabrous herb with alternating subovate-elliptic leaves measuring approximately 1,5 by 2,5 cm. Resembles Peperomia vallensis and Peperomia suratana but differs from these by the shape of the leaves.

References

Endemic flora of Ecuador
litana
Critically endangered plants
Taxonomy articles created by Polbot
Taxa named by William Trelease